The Step-well of Ambapur is a  stepwell in the village of Ambapur, close to the state capital, Gandhinagar. The stepwell is believed to be built in the 15th century although it doesn't have any inscription. The step-well or 'Vav', as it is called in Gujarati, is intricately carved and is five stories in depth. Such step wells were once integral to the semi-arid regions of Gujarat as they provided basic water needs for drinking, washing and bathing. These wells were also venues for festivals and sacred rituals.

Gallery

References 

Stepwells in Gujarat
Gandhinagar district
Tourist attractions in Gujarat